Sandro Bregadze is a Georgian politician. He was also a Member of Parliament from 2000 to 2004. From 2014 to 2016 he served as the deputy minister in the State Ministry on Diaspora Issues of Georgia. In 2017, he established the nationalist organisation Georgian March, which became a political party in 2020 and participated in legislative elections.

References

Living people
21st-century politicians from Georgia (country)
Democracy activists from Georgia (country)
Nationalists from Georgia (country)
1971 births